This list of the prehistoric life of Tennessee contains the various prehistoric life-forms whose fossilized remains have been reported from within the US state of Tennessee.

Precambrian
The Paleobiology Database records no known occurrences of Precambrian fossils in Alabama.

Paleozoic

Selected Paleozoic taxa of Tennessee

 †Acodus
 †Actinoceras
 †Actinocrinites
 †Agaricocrinus
  †Agaricocrinus americanus
 †Amplexopora
 †Amplexus
 †Ampyx
 †Aphetoceras
 †Atrypa
 †Atrypa reticularis – report made of unidentified related form or using admittedly obsolete nomenclature
 †Aulopora
 †Bellerophon
 †Bembexia
 †Bimuria
  †Bumastus
 †Calymene
 †Calymene niagarensis
 †Calyptaulax
 †Camarotoechia
 †Cartersoceras – type locality for genus
 †Ceratopsis
 †Ceraurinus
 †Ceraurus
 †Chasmatopora
 †Cheirurus
 †Chonetes
 †Chonetes glenparkensis – or unidentified related form
 †Christiania
  †Cincinnetina
 †Cincinnetina meeki
 †Cladochonus
 †Cladochonus crassus
 †Cleiothyridina
 †Columnaria
 †Columnaria alveolata
 †Conocardium
  †Constellaria
 †Coolinia
 †Cornulites
 †Cornulites proprius
 Crania
 †Craniops
 †Crepicephalus
 †Crepipora
  †Cruziana
 †Ctenostoma
 †Cyathocrinites
 †Cyclonema
 †Cyphaspis
 †Cypricardinia
  †Cyrtoceras
 †Cyrtolites
 †Cystodictya
  †Dalmanites
 †Dicoelosia
 †Dimerocrinites
 †Dimerocrinites carleyi
 †Dimerocrinites inornatus
 †Dimerocrinites occidentalis
 †Distomodus
 †Distomodus staurognathoides
 †Eatonia
 †Echinosphaerites
 †Eospirifer
 †Eospirifer radiatus
 †Eretmocrinus
 †Eretmocrinus magnificus
  †Eucalyptocrinites
 †Eucalyptocrinites caelatus
 †Eucalyptocrinites crassus
 †Favositella
 †Favosites
 †Favosites forbesi
 †Favosites spinigerus
 †Fenestella
 †Fletcheria
  †Flexicalymene
 †Flexicalymene meeki
 †Flexicalymene senaria
 †Foerstia
 †Forbesiocrinus
  †Gilbertsocrinus
 †Girvanella
 †Glyptocrinus
 †Gonioceras
 †Gravicalymene
  †Grewingkia
 †Grewingkia canadensis
 †Hallopora
 †Hedstroemia
 †Helcionopsis
 †Helcionopsis striata
 †Hibbertia
 †Hindia
 †Holopea
 †Hyolithes
 †Illaenus
  †Isotelus
 †Kockelella
 †Krausella
 †Lingulella
 †Lonchodomas
 †Marsupiocrinus
 †Meristella
 †Meristina
 †Monomorphichnus
 †Orthoceras
 †Ozarkodina
 †Ozarkodina confluens
 †Paciphacops
  †Pentremites
 †Phragmolites
 †Phycodes
 †Phylloporina
 †Plaesiomys
 †Planolites
 †Platyceras – type locality for genus
 †Platycrinites
  †Platystrophia
 †Platystrophia acutilirata
 †Platystrophia cypha
 †Plectoceras
 †Pleurodictyum
 †Plumulites
 †Proetus
 †Protosalvinia
 †Pterotheca
 †Quadratia
  †Rusophycus
 †Sagenocrinites
 †Salterella
 †Siphonotreta
 †Skenidioides
 †Skolithos
 †Solenopora
 †Solenopora compacta
 †Sowerbyella
 †Sphaerocodium – tentative report
 †Spirifer
 Spirorbis
 †Spyroceras
 †Stigmatella
  †Strophomena
 †Strophomena concordensis
 †Strophomena filitexta
 †Strophomena incurvata
 †Strophomena neglecta
 †Strophomena planumbona
 †Subulites
 †Taxocrinus
 †Tentaculites
 †Tetradium
  †Tricrepicephalus
 †Trimerus
 †Westonia
 †Whiteavesia
 †Wurmiella
 †Wurmiella excavata

Mesozoic

Selected Mesozoic taxa of Tennessee

 Acirsa
 Acmaea
  †Acteon
 †Aenona
 Amauropsis
 †Ampullina
 †Ancilla
 †Anomia
 †Anomoeodus
 †Arca
 Arctica
  †Avitelmessus
 †Avitelmessus grapsoideus
  †Baculites
 †Baculites grandis
 †Baculites ovatus
 Barbatia
 Brachidontes
 Cadulus
 Caestocorbula
 †Caestocorbula crassiplica
 Callianassa
 †Callianassa mortoni
 †Calliomphalus
 †Calliomphalus americanus – type locality for species
  Cancellaria
 Capulus
 †Caveola
 Cerithiopsis
 Cerithium
 Charonia
 Chiton
 Clavagella
  Cliona
 †Conorbis
 Corbula
 †Crania – tentative report
 †Crenella
 †Crenella elegantula
 †Crenella serica
  Cucullaea
 †Cucullaea capax
 †Cucullaea littlei
 Cylichna
 †Cylichna incisa
 †Dentalium
  †Discoscaphites
 †Discoscaphites iris
 †Dolicholatirus
 †Ecphora
  †Enchodus
 †Eothoracosaurus
 †Eothoracosaurus mississippiensis
 †Eulima
 †Euspira
 †Eutrephoceras
 †Exilia
 †Exogyra
 †Exogyra cancellata
 †Exogyra costata
 Fasciolaria – tentative report
  Gastrochaena
 †Gegania
  Gemmula
 Glossus
 Glycymeris
 †Hamulus
 †Helicoceras
 †Helicoceras navarroense
  †Hoploparia
  †Inoceramus
 †Inoceramus proximus
 †Inoceramus sagensis
 †Ischyrhiza
 †Ischyrhiza mira
 Latiaxis
 Limatula
 †Linearis
 Lithophaga
 Littorina
 Lopha
 †Lopha falcata
 †Lucina
 †Mammila
 Martesia
 †Mathilda
 Melanatria
  Membranipora
 Meretrix
 †Metopaster
 Micropora
 †Morea
  †Mosasaurus
 †Neithea
 †Neithea quinquecostata
 Nucula
 †Nucula percrassa
 †Obeliscus
 †Odostomia
 †Odostomia plicata – type locality for species
 Opalia
 Ostrea
 Panopea
 † Paranomia
  †Pecten
 †Pedalion
 †Peneus
 Pholadomya
 †Pholadomya occidentalis
 †Plioplatecarpus
 †Plioplatecarpus depressus
 Polinices
  †Prognathodon
 †Protocardia
 †Pteria
  †Pterotrigonia
 †Pterotrigonia angulicostata
 †Pterotrigonia thoracica
 Pycnodonte
 Ringicula
 †Ringicula pulchella
 Rissoina
 Rostellaria – tentative report
 †Sargana
  †Saurodon – tentative report
 † Scala
  Scaphander
 †Scaphites
 †Schizobasis
 Seila
 †Seminola
 Serpula
 Serpulorbis
 †Siphonaria
 Teinostoma
 Tellina
 †Tenea
 †Teredo
  †Toxochelys
 †Toxochelys latiremis
 Trichotropis
 †Trigonia
 Trochus
 †Tuba
 Turbinella
 †Turricula
 Turris
  Turritella
 †Turritella bilira
 †Turritella paravertebroides
 †Turritella tippana
 †Turritella trilira
 †Turritella vertebroides
 Yoldia

Cenozoic

 Aegolius
 †Aegolius acadicus
  †Aegolius funereus
 Alligator
 Alnus
 †Ambystoma
 †Androglandula – type locality for genus
 †Androglandula tennessensis – type locality for species
 †Arctomeles
 †Arctomeles dimolodontus – type locality for species
 Athleta
 †Athleta rugatus
  †Basilosaurus
 †Basilosaurus cetoides – or unidentified comparable form
 †Berhamniphyllum – type locality for genus
 †Berhamniphyllum claibornense – type locality for species
 Betula
 †Blattotermes
 †Blattotermes wheeleri – type locality for species
 Bonasa
 †Bonasa umbellus
 Brachidontes – or unidentified comparable form
 †Brachidontes saffordi
 †Caesalpinia
 †Caesalpinia claibornensis – type locality for species
 Canis
  †Canis dirus – tentative report
 Capella
 †Capella gallinago
 Carduelis
 †Carduelis pinus
 Carpodacus
 †Carpodacus purpureus
 Carya
 †Castaneoidea – type locality for genus
 †Castaneoidea puryearensis – type locality for species
 †Castanopsoidea – type locality for genus
 †Castanopsoidea columbiana – type locality for species
 Castor
 †Castor canadensis
  †Castoroides
 Celtis
 Cervus
 †Cervus elaphus
 Chaetura
 †Chaetura pelagica
 Chrysemys
 Clethrionomys
 †Clethrionomys gapperi
 Colaptes
 †Colaptes auratus
 Coluber
 Corbula
 †Corbula subcompressa
  †Cormohipparion – or unidentified comparable form
 Coturnicops
 †Coturnicops noveboracensis
 Crassatella
 †Crassatella gabbi
  Crotalus
 Cucullaea
 †Cucullaea saffordi
 Cyanocitta
 †Cyanocitta cristata
 Desmognathus
 Didelphis
 †Didelphis virginiana
 †Diplotropis
 †Diplotropis claybornensis – type locality for species
 †Ectopistes
  †Ectopistes migratorius
 †Elater
 †Elater berryi – type locality for species
 †Eoglandulosa – type locality for genus
 †Eoglandulosa warmanensis – type locality for species
 †Eomimosoidea – type locality for genus
 †Eomimosoidea plumosa – type locality for species
 Eptesicus
 †Eptesicus fuscus
 Equus
 †Equus complicatus
 †Equus leidyi
 Eremophila
  †Eremophila alpestris
 Erethizon
 †Erethizon dorsatum
 Falco
  †Falco sparverius
 †Folindusia
 †Folindusia wilcoxiana
 †Formicium – type locality for genus
 †Formicium berryi – type locality for species
 †Fraxinus
 Geomys
 Glaucomys
 †Glaucomys sabrinus
 Glycymeris
 Glyptemys
 †Glyptemys insculpta
 †Hippomaneoidea – type locality for genus
 †Hippomaneoidea warmanensis – type locality for species
 Hyla
  †Hyla femoralis
 †Knightiophyllum
 †Knightiophyllum wilcoxianum
 †Laevibuccinum
 †Laevibuccinum constrictum
 Lepus
 †Lepus americanus
 Lontra
 †Lontra canadensis
 Lynx
 †Lynx rufus – or unidentified comparable form
  †Machairodus – or unidentified comparable form
 †Mammut
 †Mammut americanum
 †Mammuthus
  †Mammuthus primigenius
 Marmota
 †Marmota monax
 †Mazzalina – or unidentified comparable form
 †Mazzalina impressa
  †Megatylopus – or unidentified comparable form
 Melanerpes
 †Melanerpes carolinus
 †Melolonthites
 †Melolonthites collinsi – type locality for species
 Mephitis
  †Mephitis mephitis
 Mesalia
 †Mesalia hardemanensis
 †Mesalia pumila
 Microtus
 †Microtus pennsylvanicus
 †Microtus xanthognathus
 †Mylohyus
 †Mylohyus fossilis
 Natica – report made of unidentified related form or using admittedly obsolete nomenclature
 †Natica saffordia
 Neotoma
  †Neotoma floridana
 Notophthalmus
 Nuculana
 †Nuculana hannahae
 †Nuculana saffordana
 Odocoileus
  †Odocoileus virginianus
 Ondatra
 †Ondatra zibethicus
 Orthoyoldia
 †Orthoyoldia kindlei
 Ostrea
 †Ostrea crenulimarginata
 †Ostrea pulaskensis
 †Otiorhynchites
 †Otiorhynchites wilcoxianus
 †Ovibovini
 Paleofroeschnerius – type locality for genus
 †Paleofroeschnerius magnus – type locality for species
 †Paleojulacea – type locality for genus
 †Paleojulacea laxa – type locality for species
 Panthera
  †Panthera onca
  †Paramylodon
 Pedioecetes
 †Pedioecetes phasianellus
 Perisoreus
 †Perisoreus canadensis
 Phenacomys
 †Phenacomys intermedius
 Pholadomya
 †Pholadomya mauryi
 Picoides
 †Picoides villosus
 Pinicola
  †Pinicola enucleator
 Pinus
 Pipilo
 †Pipilo erythrophthalmus
 Pitar – tentative report
 †Pitar ripleyanus
 Pituophis
 Plethodon
 †Plionarctos
  †Pristinailurus – type locality for genus
 †Pristinailurus bristoli – type locality for species
 Procyon
 †Procyon lotor
 Quercus
  †Regina – or unidentified comparable form
 Salix
 Sayornis
 †Sayornis phoebe
 Sciurus
 †Sciurus carolinensis
 Scolopax
 †Scolopax minor
 Sistrurus – or unidentified comparable form
 Sitta
 †Sitta canadensis
  †Smilodon
 †Smilodon fatalis
 Sorex
 †Sorex arcticus
 †Sorex hoyi
 †Sorex palustris
 Spermophilus
 †Spermophilus tridecemlineatus
 Sternotherus
 Strix
 †Strix varia
  Sturnella
 Surnia
 †Surnia ulula
 Sylvilagus
  †Sylvilagus aquaticus – or unidentified comparable form
 †Sylvilagus floridanus
 Tamias
 †Tamias striatus
 Tamiasciurus
 †Tamiasciurus hudsonicus
  Tapirus
 †Tapirus haysii
 †Tapirus polkensis
 †Tapirus veroensis
  †Teleoceras
 †Teleoceras aepysoma – type locality for species
 Tellina
 †Tellina estellensis
 †Tornatellaea
 †Tornatellaea quercollis
 Trachemys
 †Trigonobalanoidea – type locality for genus
 †Trigonobalanoidea americana – type locality for species
 †Tsuga
 Turdus
 †Turdus migratorius
 Turritella
 †Turritella saffordi
 †Turritella tennesseensis
 Tympanuchus
 †Tympanuchus cupido
 Ulmus
 Ursus
  †Ursus americanus
 Venericardia
 †Venericardia hijuana
 †Venericardia mediaplata
 Zonotrichia
 †Zonotrichia albicollis

References
Citations

Bibliography
 

Tennessee